Maria Dmitreyevna Raevskaia-Ivanova (Ukrainian: Марія Дмитрівна Раєвська-Іванова; 1840, near Gavrilovka, Izyumsky Uyezd, Kharkiv Governorate – October 1912, in Kharkiv) was a Ukrainian painter and art teacher. In 1868, she became the first woman in the Russian Empire to be awarded the title of "Free Artist" by the Imperial Academy of Arts.

Biography 
She was born to a family of landowners and was educated at home. Then, she studied abroad for five years in France, Italy and Dresden, attending courses in ethnology, archaeology, art history and linguistics in addition to her regular art classes.

When she returned in 1868, she passed the exam for "Free Artist" at the Imperial Academy and, the following year, settled in Kharkov, where she opened a private drawing and painting school that provided free room and board for the poor. In 1872, Mariya Ivanova Rajevska received the title of Honorary Member of the Academy for the innovative methods she applied in her private studio, which won her pupils prizes at exhibitions. The school she founded was in operation for twenty-seven years and taught approximately 900 students, including Serhii Vasylkivsky, Alexei Beketov and Konstantin Pervukhin. At the All-Russia Exhibition of Drawing Schools, it bested the much more prestigious Stroganov School.

In 1896, it became a public facility, operated by the city. Then, in 1912, it became the "Kharkov Art College"; a satellite school of the Imperial Academy, under the direction of Alexander Lubimov. During the Soviet Era it was a technical school and is now known as the "Kharkiv State Academy of Design and Arts".

In addition to her painting and teaching, she was the author of numerous articles and pamphlets on art instruction, as well as a textbook, "The ABCs of Drawing for the Family and the School" (1879).

Her husband, was also a teacher and served on the Kharkov City Council. Her son, was a technical engineer who helped design several familiar types of Russian locomotives.

References

External links

1840 births
1912 deaths
People from Kharkiv Oblast
People from Izyumsky Uyezd
Russian women painters
19th-century Ukrainian painters
20th-century Ukrainian painters
19th-century women artists from the Russian Empire
20th-century Russian women artists